Larry Klein born 1956) is an American musician, songwriter, record and soundtrack producer, and head of Strange Cargo, an imprint with Universal Music Group.

Musician discography
As bass player:

2020s

 2021: Triage - Rodney Crowell
 2021: The Fool & the Scorpion - Sharon Corr
 2020: Sunset in the Blue - Melody Gardot
 2020: Music... The Air That I Breathe - Cliff Richard

2010s

 2019: Higher Ground - Jon Regen
 2018: Anthem - Madeleine Peyroux
 2017: A Woman's Work - Jude Johnstone
 2014: Rumours of Glory - Bruce Cockburn
 2013: What's Left Is Forever - Thomas Dybdahl
 2013: The Vehicle - Marcella Detroit
 2012: Mr. Bad Example / Mutineer – Warren Zevon
 2012: Slingshot – Rebecca Pidgeon
 2011: Pinnacle: Live & Unreleased from Keystone Korner – Freddie Hubbard
 2010: Be My Thrill – The Weepies
 2010: Rounder Records 40th Anniversary Concert
 2010: Synthesis – Raul Midón
 2010: The Imagine Project – Herbie Hancock
 2010: The Singer Songwriter Collection – Amy Grant

2000s

 2009: Bare Bones – Madeleine Peyroux
 2009: Last Kiss – Zachary Richard
 2009: My One and Only Thrill – Melody Gardot
 2009: My One and Only Thrill / Live in Paris EP – Melody Gardot
 2009: Tide – Luciana Souza
 2008: Behind the Velvet Curtain – Rebecca Pidgeon
 2008: Christmas & Hits Duos – Aaron Neville
 2008: Circus Money – Walter Becker
 2008: Crazy Love – Jackie Bristow
 2007: Close to Dark – Brandi Shearer
 2007: Heavenly Voices [Angel] – Ryland Angel
 2007: I Love You – Diana Ross
 2007: King Kong – Les Deux Love Orchestra
 2007: Notes from Whistler – Alessandro Alessandroni
 2007: River: The Joni Letters – Herbie Hancock
 2007: Shine – Joni Mitchell
 2007: Siren – Sasha & Shawna
 2006: Dreaming Through the Noise – Vienna Teng
 2006: Life Less Ordinary – Mindi Abair
 2006: Wicked Little High – Bird York
 2005: Anthology: The Soul-Jazz Fusion Years 66–82 – Freddie Hubbard
 2005: Chronicles – Cher
 2005: Joni Mitchell Special Edition – Joni Mitchell
 2005: Songs Chosen by Her Friends & Fellow Musicians – Joni Mitchell
 2005: Songs for Sanity – John 5
 2005: Songs of a Prairie Girl – Joni Mitchell
 2005: That's Live – Julia Fordham
 2005: Tough on Crime – Rebecca Pidgeon
 2004: California – Wilson Phillips
 2004: Dreamland – Joni Mitchell
 2004: Footprints: The Life and Music of Wayne Shorter – Wayne Shorter
 2004: Play the Videos – Peter Gabriel
 2004: That's Life – Julia Fordham
 2004: The Beginning of Survival – Joni Mitchell
 2004: The Essential Rodney Crowell – Rodney Crowell
 2003: Hit – Peter Gabriel
 2003: The Complete Geffen Recordings – Joni Mitchell
 2003: Tranquil Moods [Delta Box]
 2003: Tranquil Moods: Forever Friends – Justo Almario
 2003: Tranquil Moods: Prelude – Justo Almario
 2003: The Velvet Hour – Bird York
 2002: Anything Anytime Anywhere (Singles 1979–2002) – Bruce Cockburn
 2002: Concrete Love – Julia Fordham
 2002: Genius: The Best of Warren Zevon – Warren Zevon
 2002: Small Worlds: The Crowell Collection 1978–1995 – Rodney Crowell
 2002: Sweet Is the Melody – Aselin Debison
 2002: The Essential Kenny Loggins – Kenny Loggins
 2001: Collection – Tracy Chapman
 2001: Greatest Hurts: The Best of Jann Arden – Jann Arden
 2001: Sweet November [Original Soundtrack]
 2001: The Best of Mary Black, Vol. 2 – Mary Black
 2001: The Best of Sessions at West 54th, Vol. 1
 2000: More Songs from Pooh Corner – Kenny Loggins
 2000: Red Room – Christopher Cross
 2000: Telling Stories – Tracy Chapman

1990s

 1999: Felicity
 1999: Grass Roots: Musical Influences & Inspiration – Ashley Beedle
 1999: Hurlyburly – David Baerwald
 1999: Painting with Words and Music – Joni Mitchell
 1999: Slowing Down the World – Chris Botti
 1998: Adam Cohen – Adam Cohen
 1998: Blender – Murmurs
 1998: Taming the Tiger – Joni Mitchell
 1998: Touched by an Angel: The Album
 1997: Behind the Eyes – Amy Grant
 1997: Monterey Jazz Festival: 40 Legendary Years
 1997: One and Only – Mary Black
 1997: Pristine Smut – Murmurs
 1997: Shine – Mary Black
 1996: Breathe – Midge Ure
 1996: Hits – Joni Mitchell
 1996: I'll Sleep When I'm Dead (An Anthology) – Warren Zevon
 1996: Keystone Bop Vol. 2: Friday & Saturday – Freddie Hubbard
 1996: Misses – Joni Mitchell
 1996: Susanna Hoffs – Susanna Hoffs
 1996: Tender City – Joy Askew
 1995: Heart of Us All – Karen Lehner
 1995: Mutineer – Warren Zevon
 1995: Randy Newman's Faust – Randy Newman
 1995: Rare on Air, Vol. 2
 1995: Refuge of the Roads [Pioneer] – Joni Mitchell
 1995: Till the Night is Gone: A Tribute to Doc Pomus
 1995: Tower of Song: The Songs of Leonard Cohen
 1994: Cover Girl – Shawn Colvin
 1994: Falling Forward – Julia Fordham
 1994: The Divine Comedy – Milla
 1994: Turbulent Indigo – Joni Mitchell
 1993: Greatest Hits – Rodney Crowell
 1993: Made in America [Original Soundtrack]
 1993: River of Souls – Dan Fogelberg
 1993: Up on the Roof: Songs from the Brill Building – Neil Diamond
 1992: Fat City – Shawn Colvin
 1992: King of Hearts – Roy Orbison
 1992: Life Is Messy – Rodney Crowell
 1992: Matters of the Heart – Tracy Chapman
 1992: Out of the Cradle – Lindsey Buckingham
 1992: The Best of Freddie Hubbard [Pablo] – Freddie Hubbard
 1991: Love Hurts – Cher
 1991: Night Ride Home – Joni Mitchell
 1991: Nothing But a Burning Light – Bruce Cockburn
 1991: Robin Hood: Prince of Thieves – Michael Kamen
 1991: Swept – Julia Fordham
 1991: The Force Behind the Power – Diana Ross
 1991: Warm Your Heart – Aaron Neville
 1990: Laura Branigan – Laura Branigan
 1990: Shaking the Tree: Sixteen Golden Greats – Peter Gabriel
 1990: Shortstop – Sara Hickman

1980s

 1989: Big Harvest – Indio
 1989: Crossroads – Tracy Chapman
 1989: Double Dose – The Heart of Gold Band
 1989: March – Michael Penn
 1989: Rock, Rhythm & Blues
 1989: The End of the Innocence – Don Henley
 1988: Chalk Mark in a Rain Storm – Joni Mitchell
 1988: Down in the Groove – Bob Dylan
 1988: Tracy Chapman – Tracy Chapman
 1987: All Systems Go – Donna Summer
 1987: Cher [1987] – Cher
 1987: Exiles – Dan Fogelberg
 1987: Plumbline – Justo Almario
 1987: Robbie Robertson – Robbie Robertson
 1987: What If – What If
 1986: So – Peter Gabriel
 1985: Dog Eat Dog – Joni Mitchell
 1985: Forever Friends – Justo Almario
 1984: Building the Perfect Beast – Don Henley
 1984: Read My Lips – Fee Waybill
 1983: Best of Live and in Studio – Freddie Hubbard
 1982: Bobby McFerrin – Bobby McFerrin
 1982: Born to Be Blue – Freddie Hubbard
 1982: Keystone Bop – Freddie Hubbard
 1982: Promontory Rider: A Retrospective Collection – Robert Hunter
 1982: Wild Things Run Fast – Joni Mitchell
 1981: A Little Night Music – Freddie Hubbard
 1981: Keystone Bop: Sunday Night – Freddie Hubbard
 1981: Rollin' – Freddie Hubbard
 1980: Live at the North Sea Jazz Festival – Freddie Hubbard

1970s

 1979: City Dreams – David Pritchard
 1979: Skagly – Freddie Hubbard
 1978: Light–Year – David Pritchard
 1976: Kellee – Kellee Patterson

Production discography
As record producer:

2020s

 2021: The Fool & the Scorpion - Sharon Corr
 2020: Music... The Air That I Breathe - Cliff Richard
 2020: Lang Lang at the Movies - Lang Lang
 2020: C'est Magnifique - Melody Gardot
 2020: Sunset in the Blue - Melody Gardot
 2020: The Woman Who Raised Me - Kandace Springs

2010s

2018: Junk - Hailey Tuck
2018: The Capitol Studios Sessions - Jeff Goldblum & Mildred Snitzer Orchestra
2018: The Book Of Longing - Luciana Souza	
2016: Soul Eyes - Kandace Springs
2020: Currency of Man - Melody Gardot
2015: Freedom & Surrender - Lizz Wright
2015: Tenderness - J.D. Souther
2014: Map to the Treasure: Reimagining Laura Nyro - Billy Childs		
2013: The Blue Room - Madeleine Peyroux	
2012: Desfado - Ana Moura	
2012: Duos III - Luciana Souza	
2012: Let's Go Out Tonight - Curtis Stigers
2012: Playlist: The Very Best of Rodney Crowell
2012: Playlist: The Very Best of Starship - Starship	 
2012: Slingshot - Rebecca Pidgeon	 
2012: The Book of Chet - Luciana Souza	
2012: The Essential - Starship	
2010: ...Featuring Norah Jones - Norah Jones	 
2010: Crazy	 
2010: Synthesis - Raul Midón
2010: The Rounder Records Story

2000s

2009: Bare Bones - Madeleine Peyroux	 
2009: Last Kiss - Zachary Richard	 
2009: My One and Only Thrill - Melody Gardot
2009: My One and Only Thrill / Live in Paris EP - Melody Gardot	 
2009: The Queer as Folk: Ultimate Threesome		
2008: Behind the Velvet Curtain - Rebecca Pidgeon	
2008: Circus Money - Walter Becker
2008: Our Bright Future - Tracy Chapman	
2008: Rio - Till Brönner	
2008: The Women [Original Soundtrack]	
2008: Then and Now: The Definitive Herbie Hancock - Herbie Hancock
2007: Close to Dark - Brandi Shearer	 
2007: Give US Your Poor		
2007: River: The Joni Letters - Herbie Hancock	 	 
2007: The New Bossa Nova - Luciana Souza	 
2006: Dreaming Through the Noise - Vienna Teng
2006: Eclectic Café: The Complete Coffee House Collection	 
2006: Greatest Hits - Huey Lewis and the News
2006: Half the Perfect World - Madeleine Peyroux	
2006: Lucky You		 
2006: Oceana - Till Brönner	 
2006: Wicked Little High - Bird York	 
2005: Brokeback Mountain [Original Motion Picture Soundtrack] - Gustavo Santaolalla
2005: Crash: Music from and Inspired by Crash	
2005: Dance Me to the End of Love - Madeleine Peyroux	
2005: Kiss Me Goodbye - Johnathan Rice	 
2005: Must Love Dogs	 
2005: Queer as Folk: The Final Season		
2005: Songs Chosen by Her Friends & Fellow Musicians - Joni Mitchell	
2005: Songs of a Prairie Girl - Joni Mitchell	
2005: Sweetheart: Love Songs [2005]		
2005: That's Live - Julia Fordham	 
2005: Tough on Crime - Rebecca Pidgeon	 
2004: Careless Love - Madeleine Peyroux	 
2004: Dreamland - Joni Mitchell	 
2004: Platinum & Gold Collection - Starship	 
2004: Polaroids: A Greatest Hits Collection - Shawn Colvin	
2004: That's Life - Julia Fordham	
2004: The Beginning of Survival - Joni Mitchell	
2004: The Essential Rodney Crowell - Rodney Crowell	 
2004: Then: Totally Oldies '80s Again, Vol. 7	
2003: Love Actually		 
2003: The Best of Mary Black: 1991-2001 - Mary Black	
2003: The Complete Geffen Recordings - Joni Mitchell	 
2003: The Velvet Hour - Bird York
2002: Concrete Love - Julia Fordham	 
2002: Small Worlds: The Crowell Collection 1978-1995 - Rodney Crowell	 
2002: Travelogue - Joni Mitchell	
2002: Wake up with You (The I Wanna Song) [Remixes] - Julia Fordham	 
2001: Sweet November [Original Soundtrack]
2001: The Best of Mary Black, Vol. 2 - Mary Black	 
2000: Both Sides Now - Joni Mitchell
2000: Duets [Original Soundtrack]	 
2000: The Best of Holly Cole - Holly Cole	
2000: VH1 Behind the Music: The Jefferson Airplane Collection - Jefferson Airplane

1990s

1999: Collection - Julia Fordham	 
1999: Felicity	
1999: Night in a Strange Town - Lynn Miles	
1999: Slowing Down the World - Chris Botti	 
1999: Torture Garden: Bizarre & Eccentric Music Compilation		
1998: Blender - Murmurs	
1998: From There to Here - Kyle Eastwood 
1998: Touched by an Angel: The Album
1997: All Over Me
1997: Dear Dark Heart - Holly Cole
1997: One and Only - Mary Black	
1997: Pristine Smut - Murmurs	
1997: Shine - Mary Black	
1997: Take a Run at the Sun - Dinosaur Jr.
1996: Grace of My Heart
1996: Party of Five [Original TV Soundtrack]
1996: Hits – Joni Mitchell
1996: Misses – Joni Mitchell	
1995: Super Hits - Rodney Crowell	
1995: White Rabbit - Murmurs	
1994: Falling Forward - Julia Fordham	
1994: It Could Happen to You		
1994: Murmurs - Murmurs	
1994: Turbulent Indigo - Joni Mitchell	 
1993: Greatest Hits - Rodney Crowell	 
1993: The Best of Starship [RCA/BMG Special Products] - Starship	
1992: Fat City - Shawn Colvin	
1992: Life Is Messy - Rodney Crowell	
1991: Greatest Hits (Ten Years and Change 1979-1991) - Starship	 
1991: Night Ride Home - Joni Mitchell	 
1991: Umbrella - The Innocence Mission
1990: Bedtime Stories - David Baerwald

1980s

1989: Big Harvest - Indio	 
1989: The Innocence Mission - The Innocence Mission	 
1988: Chalk Mark in a Rain Storm - Joni Mitchell	
1988: Out of the Silence - Dare	 
1987: No Protection / Love Among the Cannibals - Starship	 
1986: The Lace - Benjamin Orr	 
1985: Dog Eat Dog - Joni Mitchell

Film and TV

2000s

2009: Being Erica: "What Goes Up Must Come Down" - TV Episode Soundtrack
2009: Just Like Me - Film Soundtrack
2009: The Answer Man - Film Soundtrack 
2008: The Women – Film Soundtrack
2008: Crazy – Film Soundtrack
2007: Lucky You – Film Soundtrack
2006: Last Holiday – Film Soundtrack
2005: Monster-in-Law – Film Soundtrack
2001: Heartbreakers – Film Soundtrack
2001: Sweet November (2001 film) – Film Soundtrack
2000: Duets – Film Soundtrack
2000: An All-Star Tribute to Joni Mitchell - TV
2000: Felicity: "Things Change (#2.15)"  - TV Episode 
2000: Felicity: "True Colors (#2.14)" - TV Episode 
2000: Felicity: "Truth or Consequences (#2.13)" - TV Episode

1990s

1999: Felicity: "Portraits (#2.9)" - TV Episode 
1999: Felicity: "Family Affairs (#2.8)"-  TV Episode 
1999: Felicity: "Getting Lucky (#2.7)" - TV Episode 
1999: Felicity: "The Love Bug (#2.6)" - TV Episode 
1999: Felicity: "Crash (#2.5)" - TV Episode 
1999: Felicity: "Ancient History (#2.3)" - TV Episode 
1999: Felicity: "The List (#2.2)" - TV Episode 
1999: Felicity: "Sophomoric (#2.1)" - TV Episode 
1999: Felicity: "Felicity Was Here (#1.22)" - TV Episode 
1999: Felicity: "The Force (#1.21)" - TV Episode 
1999: Sugar Town - Soundtrack
1999: Felicity: "Gimme an O! (#1.11)" - TV Episode 
1998: Felicity: "Finally (#1.10)" - TV Episode 
1998: Felicity: "Thanksgiving (#1.9)" - TV Episode 
1998: Felicity: "Drawing the Line: Part 2 (#1.8)" - TV Episode
1998: Felicity: "Cheating (#1.6)" - TV Episode 
1998: Felicity: "Spooked (#1.5)" - TV Episode 
1998: Felicity: "Boggled (#1.4)" - TV Episode 
1998: Felicity: "The Last Stand (#1.2)" - TV Episode 
1998: Felicity: - TV series soundtrack
1998: Hurlyburly – Film Soundtrack
1996: Grace of My Heart – Film Soundtrack
1995: Clockwork Mice – Film Soundtrack
1994: It Could Happen to You - Film Soundtrack
1991: Highlander II: The Quickening - Film Soundtrack
1990: 3 Men and a Little Lady – Film Soundtrack

1980s

1980: Raging Bull - Film Soundtrack

Songwriter discography

2010s

 2018: Anthem - Madeleine Peyroux
 2018: All These Things - Thomas Dybdahl
 2015: Tenderness - J. D. Souther
 2015: Freedom & Surrender - Lizz Wright
 2014: No Small Thing - J-Mood
 2013: What's Left Is Forever - Thomas Dybdahl
2012: Something To Believe In - Anna Bergendahl
2012: Slingshot – Rebecca Pidgeon

2000s

2009: Last Kiss - Zachary Richard
2009: Tide - Luciana Souza
2009: Bare Bones - Madeleine Peyroux
2008: Circus Money - Walter Becker
2007: The New Bossa Nova – Luciana Souza
2006: Half the Perfect World - Madeleine Peyroux
2006: Oceana - Till Brönner
2004: Careless Love - Madeleine Peyroux
2002: I Just Want To Feel Love – Jackie Bristow
2002: That's Life – Julia Fordham
2002: Roadside Angel – Julia Fordham

1990s

1999: Slowing Down the World (2 songs) – Chris Botti
1998: Fundamental Things (1 Song) – Bonnie Raitt
1992: Fat City – Shawn Colvin
1991: Night Ride Home - Joni Mitchell
1990: Bedtime Stories - David Baerwald

1980s

1988: Chalk Mark in a Rain Storm - Joni Mitchell
1985: Dog Eat Dog - Joni Mitchell

References

Klein, Larry